The 53rd Army Division was formed on February 15, 1968 from Tibet Unit 843, and 153rd, 4th and 3rd Regiment of Tibet Military District. At its formation the division was composed of:
157th Infantry Regiment (former 153rd);
158th Infantry Regiment (former 4th);
159th Infantry Regiment (former 3rd);
310th Artillery Regiment.

The division has been stationed in Nyingchi, Tibet since its formation.

In December 1969 its 310th Artillery Regiment was renamed as Artillery Regiment, 53rd Army Division.

On September 24, 1985 the division was reduced and renamed as the 53rd Mountain Motorized Infantry Brigade, a Motorized Infantry Brigade of High Altitude.

In 2017 the brigade was re-organized as the 53rd Mountain Combined Arms Brigade.

References 

 中国人民解放军各步兵师沿革

053
Tibet Military District
Military units and formations established in 1968